John Joseph McDonald (January 27, 1883 – April 9, 1950), born John Joseph Mc Donnell, was a pitcher in Major League Baseball. He played for the Washington Senators in 1907.

References

External links

1883 births
1950 deaths
Major League Baseball pitchers
Washington Senators (1901–1960) players
Baseball players from Pennsylvania
Tacoma Tigers players
Punxsutawney Policemen players